Feldgrau (English: field-grey) is a grayish green color. It was the official basic color of military uniforms of the German armed forces from the early 20th century until 1945 (West Germany) or 1989 (East Germany). Armed forces of other countries also used various shades of that color. Feldgrau was used to refer to the color of uniforms of the armies of Germany, first the Imperial German Army and later the Heer (ground forces) of the Reichswehr and the Wehrmacht.

Variations 
In World War I the color feldgrau was a light grey-green, though there were variations of the shade ranging from greys to browns. It was one of the first standardized uniforms suitable to the age of smokeless gunpowder.

Feldgrau is commonly used to refer to the color of German army uniforms during World War II. It was also used by the East German National People's Army, under the description steingrau (stone-grey). Feldgrau was introduced to the Austrian Bundesheer in line to the German pattern as well.

History
In 1907, the so-called field-grey peace uniform (feldgraue Friedensuniform), with colored cuffs, facings, shoulder straps and gorgets was issued by decree in Prussia, followed by the non-Prussian contingents of the other German states and lastly by the Bavarian Army in April 1916. Formerly most infantry regiments in the German Imperial Army wore "Prussian blue" tunics, although Bavarian units had light blue and jägers dark green. Cavalry uniforms were of a wide range of colors. Until the outbreak of war in August 1914, the traditional brightly colored uniforms of the Deutsches Heer continued to be worn as parade and off-duty wear. Barracks dress was normally an off-white fatigue dress and the field-grey uniform introduced in 1910 was generally reserved for manoeuvres and field training. Upon the outbreak of war field-grey became the normal uniform of all German soldiers. Active service experience led to the adoption of a darker grey-green shade of color in 1915, now described as "stone-grey".  

Following the German example, other countries selected feldgrau in either light grey or grey-green shades as the basic color for their service uniforms. Examples were Portugal (1910), and Sweden (1923). After testing, Italy adopted a similar colored uniform with a greenish tinge on 4 December 1908, known as Grigio Verde.

Other countries today

Austria
 

In 1909 the Austro-Hungarian Army adopted pike-grey (Hechtgrau) as the color of the field service uniform of its infantry, artillery, engineers and transport units. Previously it had been reserved for Jaeger and Landwehr regiments. Following the outbreak of World War I the light blue-grey shade of Hechtgrau proved unsuited for campaigning in Europe and from 1915 onwards the grey-green feldgrau was substituted.  

At the formation of the First Austrian Republic's armed forces in 1929, there were strong similarities to German uniforms, including the feldgrau uniform and the corps colors and rank insignia adopted.

Today, in accordance with national traditions, the uniform color of the Austrian Armed Forces is named feldgrau, though other shades such as braungrau (English: brown-grey), and steingrau (stone-grey) are used, along with NATO-oliv (NATO-olive).

Chile 
The Chilean Army also wears a full dress uniform in feldgrau.

Finland
The current dress uniform of the Finnish Army (M/83) is a grey uniform  patterned after the German 1944 uniform. The Finnish Army has used grey uniforms since its founding in 1918. M/83 and its equally grey predecessors were used as the common service uniform up to the 1980s, with camouflage (M/62) used only in the field uniform. Today, the common service uniform is a camouflage uniform (M/62, M/91 or M/05). The grey colour is called kenttäharmaa (literally "field grey") in Finnish, sometimes also known as armeijan harmaat (army greys). "Going into army greys" remains a popular saying for entering military service.

Sweden
The Swedish Armed Forces used a very similar color for infantry uniforms; for example the grey 
m/39 and later on grey-green, as the German ones. The last uniform in the latter color was the woollen m/58 winter uniform.

Shades of grey
The table below shows some shades of grey in line to the rough RAL colors

See also 
 Hechtgrau
 Marengo
 OG-107
 Slate gray

References 

Military uniforms
Shades of gray